The LIT Ranch is an  ranch located on the Canadian River in the Texas counties of Oldham, Hartley, Moore, and Potter. 

The ranch was established by Major George W. Littlefield in 1877. By 1878, it included an area 30 miles north to south and 25 miles east to west, centered on the Canadian River. By 1881, the ranch had grown to include 1,000 square miles and 17,000 head of cattle, when it was sold to the Prairie Land and Cattle Company. The company sold 49,022 acres to Lee Bivins in 1908, and another 6,260 acres in June 1909, which included the Tascosa town site. In 1918, Bivins added another 45,448 acres to the ranch.

The ranch is currently owned by the W. H. O'Brien family in Amarillo, Texas.

Reference

External links

Ranches in Texas
Buildings and structures in Oldham County, Texas
Buildings and structures in Hartley County, Texas
Buildings and structures in Moore County, Texas
Buildings and structures in Potter County, Texas
1877 establishments in Texas
American companies established in 1877